Preston Rogers Bassett (March 20, 1892 – April 30, 1992) was an inventor, engineer, and pioneer in instruments for aviation.

Biography
Preston Rogers Bassett was born in Buffalo, New York, son of urban planner Edward Murray Bassett and Annie Preston Bassett. Geologist Isabel Bassett Wasson was his sister. He received an A.B. from Amherst College in 1913 and attended the Polytechnic Institute of Brooklyn in 1913-1914. He received two honorary degrees, an M.A. and a D.Sc., from Amherst College, and an honorary LLD from Adelphi College. He married Jeanne Reed Mordorf in 1919 and had four children. Jeanne Reed Mordorf was born November 1, 1893 in Trenton, NJ, graduated from Vassar College in 1915. They were married in Brooklyn May 24, 1919. Their home from 1925-1952 was 104 Broadway, Rockville Centre, NY.

Career at Sperry
Bassett worked for the Sperry Gyroscope Company for his whole career, where he rose from research engineer (1914) to Chief Engineer (1929), Vice-President in Charge of Engineering (1932), General Manager (1944), and President (1945-1956). He was also Vice President of the merged Sperry Corporation (1950-1957). He held 35 patents awarded between 1920 and 1937, including several for improved high-intensity carbon arc lights used in anti-aircraft searchlights and movie projectors. He helped Albert A. Michelson use arc light and gyroscope technology to measure the speed of light at Mount Wilson in June, 1924. He also developed the first soundproofing systems for airplanes and worked closely with Sperry founder Elmer Ambrose Sperry on several flight instruments based on gyroscopes, especially the gyrocompass, crucial to flying safely at night and in bad weather. The first blind landing (now called an instrument landing) was made by aviation pioneer Jimmy Doolittle in 1929 using Sperry instruments.

Later life and work
Bassett's many interests in addition to aviation included antique collecting, early technology, and history of Long Island and New England.  He was President of the Institute of Aeronautical Sciences (1947), Nassau Historical Society (1947-1954), Friends of Old Bethpage Village (1966-1970), and Keeler Tavern Preservation Society in Ridgefield, Connecticut (1968-1972). He served as Vice President of the Society for the Preservation of Long Island Antiquities (1962-1972) and New York State Historical Association in Cooperstown, New York (1964-1975). He served as Chairman of the Board of Trustees of the Polytechnic Institute of Brooklyn (1952-1961). He was a director of Abilities, Inc., a company that employed the handicapped. He was a fellow of the American Physical Society, American Association for the Advancement of Science, American Institute of Aeronautics and Astronautics, and Institute of Aeronautical Sciences. He was a member of the National Advisory Committee for Aeronautics (NACA) from 1954-1958, when it became the present National Aeronautics and Space Administration (NASA). He was a keen observer of atmospheric phenomena encouraging others to look skyward to see the optical effects of clouds, raindrops, and ice crystals. He painted still lives and landscapes. He wrote books and articles on topics ranging from Long Island Craftsmen to Shadow Bands and Searchlights. His lectures to local groups on these topics were very popular. In his eighties and nineties he embarked on an "uncollecting" program in which he gave antiques to the Smithsonian Institution, Henry Ford Museum, Mead Art Museum, Old Bethpage Village, Farmers' Museum, Keeler Tavern, and others, always encouraging the museums to put his antiques into historical context. He died on April 30, 1992 at the age of 100.

References 

Bassett, Preston R. Life and Times of Preston R. Bassett. (privately published, April, 1976)
The National Cyclopaedia of American Biography (New York, J. T. White: 1892-)
Early Contributions to Aviation Online Course, including (in Session 3) Bassett's role in blind flying and searchlights
US Patent search page, search for Preston and Bassett in Inventor name, 1790-present

Further reading

Jessup, Peter. Interview with Preston R. Bassett on Motion Pictures and Blind Flying (24 pp, Columbia University: Oral History Project, July 1980)
Jaffe, Bernard Michelson and the Speed of Light, Biography of a Scientist (197 pp, Garden City, New York: Doubleday, 1960)
Bassett, Preston R with Margaret F. Bartlett; illustrated by Jim Arnosky. Raindrop stories. (40 pp., New York: Four Winds Press, 1981)
Bassett, Preston R; Arthur L. Hodges. The History of Rockville Centre. (244 pp, Uniondale, New York: Salisbury Printers, 1969) 
Bassett, Preston R. Shadow Bands and Searchlights. Popular Astronomy, Vol. XXXIII, No 4, pp1–5, April, 1925.
Bassett, Preston R. Passenger Comfort in Air Transportation. Journal Aeronautical Science, Vol. 2, pp 48–50, March, 1935.
Bassett, Preston R. Long Island, Cradle of Aviation. Long Island Forum, Amityville, NY, pp 1–42, November, 1950.
Bassett, Preston R. Sperry's Forty Years in the Progress of Science. Sperry Scope Corporate Newsletter, 1950.
Bassett, Preston R. The Local Potters of Long Island. The Long Island Courant, Vol. 1, No 1, pp 1–14, March, 1965.
Bassett, Preston R. Towns in the Ridges. The Bulletin of the Antiquarian and Landmarks Society of Connecticut, Vol. XVII, No 1, pp 6–10, July, 1965.
Bassett, Preston R. The Silver Betty Lamp. The Rushlight, Vol. XXXVI, No 1, pp 9–10, February, 1970.

Amherst College alumni
1892 births
1992 deaths
American centenarians
Men centenarians
American aerospace engineers
20th-century American engineers
20th-century American inventors
Fellows of the American Physical Society